Mostkowo  is a village in the administrative district of Gmina Łukta, within Ostróda County, Warmian-Masurian Voivodeship, in northern Poland.

The village has a population of 570.

During World War II, in 1941, the Germans operated a forced labour camp for women in the village.

References

Mostkowo